Communist Party of Germany (in German: Kommunistische Partei Deutschlands, KPD) is a name that has been and is being used by several Communist organizations in Germany.

The original Communist Party of Germany, founded in 1919. It was banned in West Germany in 1956, and became part of the Socialist Unity Party in East Germany
Communist Party of Germany/Marxists–Leninists (KPD/ML), a West German Maoist group existing from 1968 to 1986
Communist Party of Germany (Roter Morgen) ("Communist Party of Germany [Red Dawn]"), a communist party named after its party newspaper founded in 1985 as a remnant of the KPD/ML
Communist Party of Germany (1990), founded in 1990, also known as Communist Party of Germany (Red Flag) after its newspaper
Communist Party of Germany (Opposition), an opposition organisation from 1928 until 1939 or 1940, illegal from 1933

See also
 The German Communist Party (1968) (DKP), formed in West Germany in 1968
Communist Workers' Party of Germany, an anti-parliamentarian communist party active in the Weimar Republic
Socialist Unity Party of Germany, the governing communist political party of East Germany